

Charts

Tables and lists

Distribution of cases by administrative regions

List of death cases

Distribution of cases by districts

Early cases 
Prior to the detection of higher volumes of cases in mid-March 2020, cases detected in the first month were well-publicised, incorporating extensive details of the patients' travel history, sources of transmission and dates of diagnosis and discharge. The following data covers positive cases detected until 10 March 2020.

See also
COVID-19 pandemic in Malaysia
COVID-19 pandemic in Sabah
COVID-19 pandemic in Sarawak
Timeline of the COVID-19 pandemic in Malaysia

Notes and references

COVID-19 pandemic in Malaysia
Malaysia